The 41st Golden Globe Awards, honoring the best in film and television for 1983, were held on January 28, 1984.

Winners and nominees

Film 

The following films received multiple nominations:

The following films received multiple wins:

Television

The following programs received multiple nominations:

The following programs received multiple wins:

Ceremony

Presenters 

 Maud Adams
 Edward Asner
 Christopher Atkins
 Anne Baxter
 Jeff Bridges
 Susan Clark
 Mike Connors
 William Devane
 Teri Garr
 Melissa Gilbert
 Louis Gossett, Jr.
 Gene Hackman
 Mariel Hemingway
 Alex Karras
 Cheryl Ladd
 Lorenzo Lamas
 Diane Lane
 Heather Locklear
 Gina Lollobrigida
 Shelley Long
 Donna Mills
 Michael Pare
 Cliff Robertson
 Mark Rydell
 Telly Savalas
 George Segal
 Connie Sellecca
 Steve Shagan
 William Shatner
 Jill St. John
 Robert Wagner
 Dee Wallace
 Lesley Ann Warren
 Richard Widmark

Cecil B. DeMille Award 
Paul Newman

See also
 56th Academy Awards
 4th Golden Raspberry Awards
 35th Primetime Emmy Awards
 36th Primetime Emmy Awards
 37th British Academy Film Awards
 38th Tony Awards
 1983 in film
 1983 in American television

References
 IMdb 1984 Golden Globe Awards

041
1983 film awards
1983 television awards
January 1984 events in the United States
Golden Globe